Emiliano Mercado del Toro (August 21, 1891 – January 24, 2007) was a Puerto Rican supercentenarian and military veteran who was, at age 115, the world's oldest person following the death of 116-year-old Elizabeth Bolden on December 11, 2006, and the world's oldest man from November 19, 2004 (death of Fred H. Hale, Sr.) until his own death on January 24, 2007.

At the time of his death in January 2007, at the age of 115 years and 156 days, Mercado was the second oldest fully validated male ever, behind Danish-American Christian Mortensen's record of 115 years 252 days. (Although Shigechiyo Izumi was still believed to be older at the time of his death. Izumi's record was withdrawn by Guinness World Records in 2010.)

Biography
Emiliano (known to his family as "Emilio") was born in Cabo Rojo, Puerto Rico, (at a time when Puerto Rico was a Spanish colony) the son of Delfín Mercado Cáceres and Gumercinda del Toro Padilla. Emiliano worked in the cane fields until the age of 81. He never married and never had children, but said he had three "girlfriends" (love interests) in his life.

Accolades
Mercado first came to the attention of longevity researchers in 2001, when a story ran about a 110-year-old veteran in a parade in Puerto Rico. After that, researchers tried to track him down, but only after the November 2004 death of Fred H. Hale, Sr. did someone finally start sending in documents. Following Mr. Hale's death, Emiliano apparently became the oldest man in the world, with documents supplied so far including a birth certificate, baptismal certificate, 1910 census record, and veteran ID card. By January 2005, Guinness had accepted Emiliano as the oldest living man.

In addition, Emiliano Mercado del Toro was 27 years old in October 1918 when the U.S. Army drafted him to serve in World War I. As a veteran of World War I he broke the record for longest-lived veteran of any military force, previously set by Antonio Todde (Mercado was still at a training camp in Panama when the November 11, 1918 armistice was declared). Mercado was discharged the following month, when he was still 27.

In 1993, he was honored by U.S. President Bill Clinton with the medal commemorating the 75th anniversary of the signing of the truce that ended World War I. Mercado del Toro, the elder of two siblings, had to move from his familiar Cabo Rojo grounds due to a fall he had in his home when he was 102, which affected his hipbone. His 85-year-old niece took him to live with his relatives, and he was well taken care of by nieces and nephews - and their families, who called him "Tío Millo" ("Uncle Millo")- at their home in Isabela.

The mayor of Isabela, Puerto Rico said a home for the elderly would be renamed in his honor.

Later life
Mercado could reminisce about being a child when U.S. troops invaded Puerto Rico in 1898, and he clearly remembered the fighting that marked the end of Spain's colonial empire in the Americas. He credited his longevity to funche, a boiled corn, codfish and milk cream-like dish, which he ate every day as a habit.

His last two birthdays were media events in the town of Isabela. Civic leaders and veterans commended Mercado on his endurance and lucid mind, but the "gift" he would enjoy the most was the visit of Puerto Rican vedette and media icon Iris Chacón. In an interview, Mercado claimed to be a great fan of the artist, and particularly of her derrière ("That rump was something serious!", he was quoted as saying). Chacón visited Mercado, who, although he could barely see or hear by the time of his 114th birthday, was pleased with her visit. His photo touching Chacón's rear end, with a big smile on his face, made newspaper headlines in Puerto Rico. She returned the following year to greet him. After hearing news of Mercado's death, Chacón was quoted as saying: "I feel like I've lost my own grandfather. I was blessed for knowing him, knowing that I made him happy, and blessed for the anecdotes and wishes he told me the times I met him. His wisdom is something I learned a lot from. His life is an example of how you're supposed to live your life, happily and doing good, for it will give you longevity and goodwill from everyone."

He was buried at Cementerio Municipal San Martín de Porres of his native town of Cabo Rojo, with mayors, legislators, fellow veterans and Puerto Rican "vedette" Iris Chacón in attendance. After his death, Emma Tillman took over as the world's oldest person and Tomoji Tanabe took over as the world's oldest man.

See also

List of Puerto Ricans
List of the verified oldest people
Longevity
Supercentenarian

References

External links

 Emiliano Mercado and Iris Chacón (photo)
 Mercado photo gallery at Puerto Rican daily newspaper El Nuevo Dia
 Obituary

1891 births
2007 deaths
United States Army personnel of World War I
American supercentenarians
Men supercentenarians
People from Cabo Rojo, Puerto Rico
Puerto Rican Army personnel
Puerto Rican centenarians
United States Army soldiers